Married to Medicine: Los Angeles is an American reality television on Bravo cable network, the second spin-off of the Married to Medicine franchise. The show premiered as an extra episode of the parent series of Married to Medicine, on March 6, 2019, with the show scheduled on Sundays afterward beginning March 10, 2019. The series chronicles the lives of six women in the Los Angeles area who are either female doctors or doctors' wives. The first season's cast consisted of Dr. Britten Cole, Dr. Imani Walker, Dr. Noelle Reid, Asha Kamali-Blankinship, and Shanique Drummond, with Jazmin Johnson in the supporting role of friend.

In December 2019, Bravo announced that Married to Medicine: Los Angeles would return for a second season. Season 2 premiered on May 3, 2020, with Dr. Kendra Segura and Lia Dias joining the cast, replacing Dr. Reid and Kamali-Blankinship, and Johnson having been promoted to main cast.

Cast
 Dr. Britten Cole
 Shanique Drummond
 Asha Kamali-Blankinship (season 1)
 Dr. Noelle Reid (season 1)
 Dr. Imani Walker
 Lia Dias (season 2)
 Jazmin Johnson (season 2; recurring season 1)
 Dr. Kendra Segura (season 2)

Episodes

Series overview

Season 1 (2019)

Season 2 (2020)

References

External links

2010s American reality television series
2019 American television series debuts
Bravo (American TV network) original programming
English-language television shows
Television series by Fremantle (company)
Television shows set in Los Angeles
2020s American reality television series
American television spin-offs
Reality television spin-offs
Women in Los Angeles